Moussaya is a town and sub-prefecture in the Forécariah Prefecture in the Kindia Region of western Guinea.

Namesake 

There are a number of other towns in Guinea with this name.

Transport 

The town in on the route of a proposed 500 km long heavy duty standard gauge railway taking iron ore to a new port at Matakong.  This station is approximately 74 km from that port.

See also 

 Railway stations in Guinea

References 

Sub-prefectures of the Kindia Region